The Eyreton Branch was a branch line railway that formed part of New Zealand's national rail network.  Located in the Canterbury region of the South Island, it left the Main North Line in Kaiapoi and was built a mere ten kilometres south of the Oxford Branch. It opened in 1875 and operated until 1954, except for the first portion, which remained open until 1965.

Despite the implication of the branch's name, it passed north of Eyreton, though its original terminus was located in West Eyreton.

Construction 

At the start of the 1870s, a number of plans were made for a branch line from the Main North Line, then under construction, to Oxford.  This was in response to the realities of the appalling communication and slow transport of the time.  One plan, made in 1871, called for a line from Kaiapoi to Oxford, but this was seen as a threat to the interests of a proposed line from Rangiora to Oxford. Intense campaigning from groups in support of either line led to the government's decision to build two branches, one from Rangiora to Oxford and another from Kaiapoi to West Eyreton.

Despite warnings the line to West Eyreton would never be profitable, contracts for construction were let in 1873, and by 1875, construction was proceeding well, with the line opened to West Eyreton on 17 December 1875. This was intended to be the terminus of the branch, but in an attempt to make it profitable, work began the next year to link it with the Oxford Branch. This was completed on 1 February 1878 and linked West Eyreton with Bennetts Junction.

For a while, a break-of-gauge existed at the junction with the Main North Line in Kaiapoi. In 1876 provincial governments were abolished and Canterbury Provincial Railways were absorbed by the central government.

Operation 

The first train to West Eyreton was hauled by a diminutive A class tank steam locomotive.  For many years, the line was serviced by one service each way per day.  These were mixed trains that carried both passengers and freight, and with the opening of the line to Bennetts Junction, they ran through to Oxford.  Much traffic carried on the Eyreton Branch was actually freight from Oxford using the Eyreton route as a shortcut to the Main North Line. Concerns that the line would not be profitable were fulfilled by low traffic volumes even before the era of widespread competition from the road, and as road transport increased in competitiveness, freight dwindled. By 1927, only four services ran per week, and in 1930, a Royal Commission suggested that the line be closed unless locals wished to fund the line. Nonetheless, the Railways Department kept operating the line, though on 9 February 1931, passenger services were cancelled due to low patronage and the link with Bennetts Junction on the Oxford Branch was closed. The Eyreton Branch did not terminate at its original terminus of West Eyreton as five kilometres of the link with the Oxford Branch was retained, with the new terminus in Horrelville.

By 1950, only two trains a week ran, on Tuesdays and Thursdays.  This in itself contributed to declining freight quantities, as wagons delivered on a Thursday would not be collected until the next week, an undesirably long delay for most businesses. Nonetheless, a flour mill along the line in Wetheral was generating some traffic for the line, and as traffic beyond it did not justify the line's existence, it was closed from Wetheral to Horrelville on 26 May 1954. By April 1965, the remaining portion of the line between Kaiapoi and Wetheral was also closed.

The branch today 

Remnants of closed railways diminish and disappear over time due to natural and human activity, and little of note remains of the Eyreton Branch. Modern-day roads closely follow the route of the railway and its formation is often visible. Loading banks can be found at the sites of the West Eyreton, Mandeville North, and Swannanoa stations, and a couple of bridge abutments and culverts survive. Otherwise, little remains of one of New Zealand's more minor branch lines.

References

Citations

Bibliography

 
 
 
 
  
 

3 ft 6 in gauge railways in New Zealand
Waimakariri District
Railway lines opened in 1878
Rail transport in Canterbury, New Zealand
Closed railway lines in New Zealand
Railway lines closed in 1965
Railway lines in New Zealand